Orlando Narváez (born 26 June 1958) is an Ecuadorian footballer. He played in five matches for the Ecuador national football team in 1983. He was also part of Ecuador's squad for the 1983 Copa América tournament.

References

1958 births
Living people
Ecuadorian footballers
Footballers from Quito
Ecuador international footballers
Association football defenders
C.D. El Nacional managers